The Scotland A cricket team toured Ireland in June 2019 to play three Twenty20 matches and 4 List-A matches.

List-A series

1st Unofficial ODI

2nd Unofficial ODI

3rd Unofficial ODI

4th Unofficial ODI

Twenty20 Series

1st Unofficial T20

References 

Cricket teams